Emil Ágoston (originally Adler) (born Zlaté Moravce, ; December 7, 1876 – June 15, 1921 in Berlin), was a notable Hungarian architect.

Life and career

Ágoston graduated at the Budapest Technical University in 1899 and completed further studies in Italy. He also spent time living in Berlin and Paris. His most productive period, as a sought after designer of apartment buildings in Budapest, was between 1906 and 1911. His style was influenced by the Romantic style, particularly its north German variants. After 1919 he established a partnership with his brother, Géza. Together they built the Roman baths in Budapest and a similar project in the Netherlands.

Works

Budapest
 Hungaria baths (VII. Dohány utca 44.) now Hotel Zara, 1906-07
 Unger house (V. Irányi u. 10.), 1906–07
 Csasznek house (I. Attila út 47.), 1906–07
 Krayer house (XIII. Csanády u. 2.), 1909–10
 Apartment building (V. Dorottya u. 9.), 1909–10
 Gyenes villa (II. Nyúl u. 6.), 1909–10
 Apartment building (VII. Wesselényi u. 32.). A 5-storey corner building which shows the north German influences but little has remained of its original facade decorations (a protected building since 1994)., 1909–10
 Former Magyar Bank (V. Kristóf tér), 1913
 Bank building (V. Bajcsy-Zsilinszky u. 36), 1913
 Astoria Hotel (Múzeum körút), with elements of the neoclassical style., 1913

Abroad
 Trieste synagogue (1908)
 Frankfurt synagogue (2nd prize in competition)
 Pervát - Jékey Albert Castle (1907)

References

External links

1876 births
1921 deaths
People from Zlaté Moravce
Hungarian architects
Austro-Hungarian architects